Trichofeltia is a genus of moths of the family Noctuidae.

Species
 Trichofeltia circumdata (Grote, 1883)

References
Natural History Museum Lepidoptera genus database
Trichofeltia at funet

Hadeninae